Death-Scort Service is a 2015 independent horror film that was directed by Sean Donohue, who co-wrote the script with Chris Woods. Funding for the movie was partially raised through an Indiegogo campaign and Death-Scourt Service released on October 13, 2015.

Synopsis
The film follows a group of prostitutes working in Las Vegas that become the focus of a serial killer intent on brutally murdering them all.

Cast
 Krystal Pixie Adams as Michelle
 Ashley Lynn Caputo as Missy
 Sean Donohue as John #1/Strip Club Patron #1
 Cayt Feinics as Jamie
 Bob Glazier as Buddy
 Lisa Marie Kart as Beverly
 Joe Makowski as Mysterious Driver
 Jessica Morgan as Tara
 Bailey Paige as Erica
 Alice Reigns as Julie
 Evan Stone as T.V. Personality
 Paula Tsurara as Candy
 Amanda Welch as Dakota
 Geneva Whitmore as Pamela
 Chris Woods as John #2/Strip Club Patron #2

Reception
Shock Till You Drop criticized the film for its poor acting and plot, but also remarked that it also "functions primarily as an attempt to keep the carnival-scumbag vibe of vintage H.G. Lewis, David Friedman and Doris Wishman alive and well" and that appreciated these aspects of Death-Scourt Service. HorrorNews.net wrote a mostly favorable review for the movie, stating "At the end of the day, there's absolutely nothing about Death-Scort Service that's subtle; it hits you repeatedly about the head and neck until the final credits roll. Sometimes it's with nudity, sometimes it's with violence. Occasionally, you get both. Again, that's definitely not a complaint. I found myself enjoying the flick even when I felt dirty, which, I guess, is a compliment. Donohue and company know their audience is filled with filthy freaks, and they're more than happy to supply our demand."

References

External links
 

2015 horror films
American horror films
2015 independent films
American independent films
Crowdfunded films
2010s English-language films
2010s American films